APT is an initialism. It may refer to:

Computing and software 
 APT (programming language) (Automatically Programmed Tool), a high-level computer programming language
 APT (software), Debian's high-level package management system, also used by other Linux-based operating systems
 Almost Plain Text, or Doxia, a wiki-like syntax used mainly by Apache Maven
 Annotation processing tool, a utility for executing annotation processors in the Java programming language
 Advanced persistent threat, a set of stealthy and continuous computer hacking processes
 Applied Predictive Technologies, a statistical business analysis software company
 Advanced Programming Techniques Ltd., creators of the Command CICS software product

Entertainment and media companies 
 Alabama Public Television, a network of PBS member stations in Alabama, U.S.A.
 American Players Theatre, a classical theater located in Spring Green, Wisconsin
 American Public Television, a television program provider in the United States
 APT Entertainment, a film production company in the Philippines

Finance 
 Automated Payment Transaction tax, a proposal to replace all taxes with a single tax on each and every transaction in the economy
 Artist Pension Trust, an investment program designed for artists
 Arbitrage pricing theory, a general theory of asset pricing

Science and medicine 
 Ammonium paratungstate, a tungsten-based chemical compound
 Atom-probe tomography, an atomic-resolution microscopy technique
 Attached proton test, a technique used in carbon-13 nuclear magnetic resonance spectroscopy
 Automatic picture transmission, a weather satellite system
 Anterior pelvic tilt
Acyl-protein thioesterase, an enzyme family that cleaves cysteine thioesters

Transportation 
 Advanced Passenger Train, a tilting passenger train designed and built during the late 1970s by British Rail
 Association for Public Transportation, a Boston-based nonprofit organization
 Australian Pacific Touring, an Australian tour operator

Other 
 Animation photo transfer process (APT process), a process used in animation
 Applied Probability Trust, a UK-based non-profit-making foundation for study and research in the mathematical sciences
 APT assault rifle
 ASEAN Plus Three, the Association of Southeast Asian Nations plus China, South Korea, and Japan
 Asia-Pacific Telecommunity, an intergovernmental organisation concerning communications technology
 The Asia Pacific Triennial, a major art exhibition at the Gallery of Modern Art, Brisbane, Australia
 Asian Poker Tour, a major poker tour focusing on the Asia-Pacific region
 Association for Preservation Technology International
 Association for Psychological Therapies, a provider of accreditation and training for mental health professionals

See also
 Apartment, sometimes abbreviated APT
 Apt (disambiguation)